Franklin Paul Peterson (1930–2000) was an American mathematician specializing in algebraic topology. He was a professor of mathematics at the Massachusetts Institute of Technology.

Life and career
Peterson was born in Aurora, Illinois, on August 27, 1930, the older of two brothers. His father died when he was young, and he was raised by his mother and uncle. He attended Northwestern University, graduating in 1952, and earned his Ph.D. in 1955 from Princeton University under the supervision of Norman Steenrod. After postdoctoral studies at Princeton, he joined the MIT faculty in 1958.

Peterson edited the Transactions of the American Mathematical Society from 1966 to 1970. He also served for many years as treasurer of the AMS; in that role he played a key role in resolving tensions between the dual directors of the society as it was then structured, and worked to build up a large reserve fund for the society.

Peterson married Marilyn Rutz in 1959.
He died of a stroke on September 1, 2000, near Washington, DC.

Contributions
Peterson's early research used cohomology to study homotopy equivalence. Later, he did important work on the properties of loop spaces.

The Peterson–Stein formula is named after him, after he wrote about it with Norman Stein in 1960. He also introduced the Brown–Peterson cohomology with Edgar H. Brown in 1966.
 
He advised over 20 doctoral students (different sources give different numbers, in part because Robert E. Mosher, whom Peterson considered his first student, had a different official advisor) and has over 100 academic descendants.

Selected publications
.

.
.
. Part II (with Frederick R. Cohen), pp. 41–51.

References

1930 births
2000 deaths
20th-century American mathematicians
Northwestern University alumni
Princeton University alumni
Massachusetts Institute of Technology School of Science  faculty
Topologists
Mathematicians from Illinois
People from Aurora, Illinois